Ruina montium (Latin, "wrecking of mountains") was allegedly an ancient Roman mining technique that draws on the principle of Pascal's barrel. Miners would excavate narrow cavities down into a mountain, whereby filling the cavities with water would cause pressures large enough to fragment thick rock walls. It was described by Pliny the Elder (Natural History 33.21), who served as procurator in Spain.

See also 
 Hushing
 Hydraulic mining
 Las Médulas

References 

Hydrostatics
Industry in ancient Rome
Mining techniques